Rasha Abdulaziz Al Roumi is a business executive from Kuwait. From 2013 to 2017 she was chair and managing director of Kuwait Airways.

Biography 
Al Roumi studied at Kuwait University, completing a bachelor's degree in insurance and statistics.

In 2014 Al Roumi was named Businesswoman of the Year by Arabian Business magazine.

References 

Living people
Kuwait University alumni
Kuwaiti chief executives
Chief executives in the airline industry
21st-century Kuwaiti businesspeople
Kuwaiti women in business
Year of birth missing (living people)